Unavailable (1977) is the third album by Clover.  It was released on Vertigo Records in the UK. In the United States and Canada, it was titled Clover and released on Mercury Records.

Track listing
All tracks composed by Alex Call and Clover; except where noted.
"Love Love" – 3:55
"Take Another Look" (Alex Call, Hugh Cregg, Sean Hooper, Clover) – 3:20
"Streets of London" (Alex Call, Michael Schreiner, Clover) – 4:31
"I Lie Awake (And Dream of You)" – 4:20
"The Storm" (Alex Call, Hugh Cregg, John McFee, Robert Lange, Clover) – 5:57
"Child of the Streets" – 3:42
"Leavin' Is" – 4:05
"Fairweather Fan" (John Ciambotti, Clover) – 3:26
"Santa Fe" – 3:21
"Show Me Your Love" (Live) – 2:58

Personnel

Clover
 Alex Call – lead vocals, guitar
 Huey Lewis – lead vocals, harmonica
 John McFee – lead guitar, pedal steel guitar, violin, vocals
 Sean Hopper – keyboards, vocals
 John Ciambotti – Fender bass, vocals
 Micky Shine – drums, percussion, vocals

Technical
Pat Moran - engineer
Dave Robinson, Jake Riviera - executive producer
Barney Bubbles - design, typography, cover illustration
Adrian Boot - photography

References

1977 albums
Clover (band) albums
Albums produced by Robert John "Mutt" Lange
Albums recorded at Rockfield Studios
Vertigo Records albums
Mercury Records albums